SJK(C) Kwang Hwa (中文：光华国民型华文小学校 Malay: Sekolah Jenis Kebangsaan (Cina) Kwang Hwa),
SJK(C) Kwang Hwa is located at Sungai Nibong next to another school, SJK(C) Shih Chung Cawangan.

References

Schools in Penang
Chinese-language schools in Malaysia